Meysam, Maitham or Maytham  is an internationally used male name given name originating from the Semitic languages. The name comes from the Arabic root w-th-m and means crushing as in the sound made by the hooves of a horse or camel.

Initially a popular name in the Muslim World (originally in the Arab World, Iran, Turkic World) and the name later became popular among the Muslims of the other countries.

People with this name

Meysam
Maytham al-Tammar (died 680 AD), was a loyal and trustworthy companion of Imam Ali ibn Abu Talib. He is revered by millions for his contributions towards Islam, discipline towards Imam Ali, and sacrifices for the religion.

Maitham 
Maitham Al Bahrani (1238-1299), 12th-century Shi’ite scholar from Bahrain

Meysam

 Meysam Kebriaei (born 1981) MD, MBA. Iranian-American pediatric neurosurgeon from Taleghan, Iran. Currently practices in Minneapolis, Minnesota. 
Meysam Maniei (born 1982), Iranian football player
Meysam Khosravi (born 1983), Iranian footballer who plays for Steel Azin F.C.
Meysam Soleimani (born 1982), Iranian football defender
Meysam Hosseini (born 1987), Iranian footballer who plays for Esteghlal

Maysam
Maysam Baou (born 1983), Iranian football player who currently plays for Shahrdari Tabriz F.C.
Maysam Aghaei (born 1990), Iranian footballer who currently plays for Shensa Arak F.C.

Meisam
Meisam Mostafa-Jokar (born 1985), freestyle wrestler from Iran
Meisam Rezapour (born 1981), Iranian football player

References 

Arabic masculine given names
Iranian masculine given names